Jorma Valtonen (29 March 1923 – 31 May 2001) was a Finnish athlete. He competed in the men's long jump at the 1952 Summer Olympics.

References

External links

1923 births
2001 deaths
Athletes (track and field) at the 1952 Summer Olympics
Finnish male long jumpers
Olympic athletes of Finland